Inishmaan Aerodrome  is located on the island of Inishmaan, one of the Aran Islands in Galway Bay off the coast of County Galway, Ireland. This aerodrome is licensed by the Aeronautical Services Department of the Irish Aviation Authority.

Service to Connemara Airport is provided by Aer Arann Islands, an airline which also serves the other Aran Islands: Inisheer and Inishmore.

In June 2018, the airline announced that it intends to terminate its PSO contract and cease all flights on 6 December 2018, two years before the contract was due to expire. This development is understood to be due to a dispute between the airline and the government relating to charges for flights that are not covered by the contract.

Airlines and destinations

Facilities

It has two runways: 15/33 has a  bituminous pavement and 05/23 has  grass surface.

References

External links
 

Airports in the Republic of Ireland
Transport in County Galway